Lloyd Andrews (December 8, 1906 – April 3, 1992) was an American actor, singer and composer known as Arkansas Slim. Born in Gravette, Arkansas, Andrews grew up on Spavinaw Creek in rural Benton County. He married Lucille Kinsey of Pineville, Arkansas in 1929, yielding a son Joseph, who also worked as an actor.

Career
He used money earned picking strawberries to buy a Model T Ford, souped the car up and went on the road doing comedy. He joined forces with a traveling showman known as Watso the Musical Wizard, who taught him handsaw and banjo.

Tex Ritter encountered Andrews doing a standup comedy routine in a tent in Monticello, Arkansas that was outdrawing Ritter's own performance. Ritter was impressed and invited Andrews to come along and work in movies with him. Andrews eventually performed in 15 films with Ritter. Although he acted as a movie cowboy, he had a hatred for horses, which is why he chose to ride a mule in many movies.

When western B-movies began to lose popularity, Andrews furthered his career by touring with Bob Wills, singing and composing songs before ultimately finding a new career as a host of weekday children's TV, starting in the early 50s as "The 49er" for KGEO-TV and KMJ-TV in Fresno, California, and then hosting "The Fun Club" at KOAM in Kansas.

Andrews and his wife Lucille returned to Gravette, where they lived until his death.

References

1906 births
1992 deaths
Male actors from Arkansas